Tomas Söderblom (born 4 April 1972) is a Finnish rower. He competed in the men's single sculls event at the 1996 Summer Olympics.

References

External links
 

1972 births
Living people
Finnish male rowers
Olympic rowers of Finland
Rowers at the 1996 Summer Olympics
People from Pargas
Sportspeople from Southwest Finland